Sir John Magill, 1st Baronet (ante 1639 – 18 January 1700) was an Anglo-Irish politician. 

Magill was given the name John Johnston at birth, the son of William Johnston and Susanna Magill. He changed his surname to Magill in 1677.

On 5 November 1680 he was made a knight bachelor by James Butler, 1st Duke of Ormond. On 10 November 1680 he was created a baronet, of Gill Hall in the Baronetage of Ireland. Between 1692 and 1693 Magill was the Member of Parliament for Hillsborough in the Irish House of Commons. He then represented Downpatrick from 1695 to 1699.

He married, firstly, Elizabeth Mary Hawkins on 13 October 1677. He married, secondly, Hon. Arabella Susanna Hamilton, daughter of Hugh Hamilton, 1st Viscount of Glenawly. Magill had no sons by either marriage and his title became extinct upon his death.

References

Year of birth uncertain
1700 deaths
17th-century Anglo-Irish people
Baronets in the Baronetage of Ireland
Irish MPs 1692–1693
Irish MPs 1695–1699
Members of the Parliament of Ireland (pre-1801) for County Down constituencies